KFF Laçi are one of the first women football clubs in Albania.The club was formed in 2007 and competed in Albania's first ever competitive tournament which was run by the Football Association of Albania, along with pJubani Shkodër, Tropoje, Olimpik, Rubiku, Memaliaj, The Door Albania. It was previously managed by former Albania national team legend Altin Rraklli, Captain Aurora Seranaj, who guided the team to success; Oltion Kernaja has taken over the management. However the 2009-10 feat has yet to be repeated.

K.F.Tirana were crowned champions of the first ever championship on January 28, 2009 after a 4–0 thrashing of Jubani Shkodër. Laçi as Tirana AS are also the first Cup Winners of the recent 2009–10 season, winning against The Door Albania by scoreline 6–0. Being therefore winners of the first two official events organised in Albania for women's football

Honours

Domestic

Albanian Women's League Champions (1): 2009–2010 

Runners-up (3): 2011–2012, 2015–2016, 2017-2018

Albanian Women's Cup Winners (1): 2009–2010 

Runners-up (1): 2017-2018

Regional

Kosovo Independency Cup Winners: 2018

Current squad

References

KFF Laçi
Tirana
Laçi
Tirana
Football clubs in Tirana
2007 establishments in Albania
2022 establishments in Albania
Women's football clubs in Albania